Marcelina Emerson (born 24 February 1991) is a Brazilian footballer who plays as a midfielder for Ħamrun Spartans. In 2013 he went with fellow Brazilian player, Thiago Araújo to play in Romania for Liga I club Viitorul Constanța.

Honours
Floriana
Maltese Super Cup: 2017
Ħamrun Spartans
Maltese Premier League: 2020–21

References

External links

1991 births
Living people
Brazilian footballers
Association football midfielders
Liga I players
Maltese Premier League players
Hellas Verona F.C. players
Jabaquara Atlético Clube players
FC Viitorul Constanța players
Floriana F.C. players
Birkirkara F.C. players
Tarxien Rainbows F.C. players
Nadur Youngsters F.C. players
Ħamrun Spartans F.C. players
Brazilian expatriate footballers
Expatriate footballers in Italy
Brazilian expatriate sportspeople in Italy
Expatriate footballers in Romania
Brazilian expatriate sportspeople in Romania
Expatriate footballers in Malta
Brazilian expatriate sportspeople in Malta